Sound Digital is a semi-national commercial digital radio multiplex in the United Kingdom, owned by Arqiva, Bauer Media Group and Wireless Group.  The multiplex covers 73% of the population from a total of 45 transmitters.

History
Following the collapse of the winning 4 Digital Group bid for the second national ensemble in 2008, the capacity was re-advertised in 2014. Two bids were received, Sound Digital and Listen2Digital, a consortium run by Orion Media and Babcock International Group. On 27 March 2015, Sound Digital were selected as the winner.

Between award and launch, Premier Praise and Panjab Radio, a Listen2Digital station, joined the line up along with DAB+ stations Fun Kids and Magic Chilled. Also, BMR and UCB Inspirational were rebranded Awesome Radio and UCB2 respectively and TalkBusiness was replaced by Listen2Digital station Share Radio.

Test transmission commenced in February 2016, which consisted of Sound Waves and Sound Waves+ for DAB and DAB+ respectively. An official launch took place on 29 February, with the majority of stations launching on this date and the remainder following over the next month.

On 15 May 2018, Sound Digital announced the planned introduction of additional 19 transmittersto improve coverage in the South West, East Anglia, Wales and North of Scotlandincreasing the multiplex's coverage to 83%, adding nearly 4 million new listeners in more than 1.6m new households.

Stations carried

DAB

DAB+

Former services
Services previously carried on the multiplex include:

Awesome Radio - never fully launched, promo barker ran from launch of SDL until removal in Aug 2017
Heat Radio - removed Feb 2019
JACK Radio - replaced by Union JACK Dance in December 2020
Kisstory - moved to Digital One in Feb 2019
Love Sport - removed late 2020
Magic Chilled - moved to local tier DAB in Feb 2019
Panjab Radio - moved to local DAB in December 2019
Share Radio - moved to online-only service May 2017
UCB2 - moved to Digital One as a DAB+ service in March 2022
Union JACK (launched on 9 September 2016, removed on 24 February 2022)
Union JACK Dance (launched on 10 December 2020, removed on 24 February 2022)
Union JACK Rock(launched on 10 December 2020, removed on 24 February 2022)

See also
Digital One

References

Digital audio broadcasting multiplexes
Radio stations established in 2016
2016 establishments in the United Kingdom